William Ball (April 7, 1830 – August 28, 1902) was an American politician who served as the 25th lieutenant governor of Michigan from 1889 to 1891. he died at age 72 in Ann Arbor Michigan

References

1830 births
1902 deaths
Republican Party members of the Michigan House of Representatives
Republican Party Michigan state senators
Lieutenant Governors of Michigan
19th-century American politicians